Gonatocerus tuberculifemur is a species of fairyfly. It is an egg parasitoid of Tapajosa rubromarginata, a leafhopper.

References

Mymaridae
Insects described in 1957